The name Atsani has been used for two tropical cyclones in the Western North Pacific Ocean. The name was contributed by Thailand and means "thunderbolt" in Thai. Atsani replaces the retired name Morakot.

Typhoon Atsani (2015) (T1516, 17W), a Category 5 super typhoon that remained in the open ocean
Severe Tropical Storm Atsani (2020) (T2020, 23W, Siony), brushed the northern Philippines and dissipated near Taiwan

See also 

 Cyclone Asani (2022) – a similar name that was used in the North Indian Ocean.

Pacific typhoon set index articles